The Amity Hills are a range of hills northeast of Amity, in Yamhill County, Oregon, United States. A northern spur or extension of the Eola Hills, they are separated from them by a pass between Amity and Hopewell. They stretch about four miles from Amity towards Dayton Prairie. With the Eola Hills they make up the Eola-Amity Hills AVA wine region. They are sometimes called the Yamhill Mountains.

References 

Hills of Oregon
Landforms of Yamhill County, Oregon